Koh Poh Koon (born 1972) is a Singaporean politician and former colorectal surgeon who has been serving as Senior Minister of State for Sustainability and the Environment since 2022 and Senior Minister of State for Manpower since 2021. A member of the governing People's Action Party (PAP), he has been the Member of Parliament (MP) representing the Tampines Central division of Tampines GRC since 2020.

Prior to entering politics, Koh was a colorectal surgeon and medical researcher. He made his political debut in the 2013 by-elections as a PAP candidate contesting in Punggol East SMC against candidates from three other opposition parties, garnering 43.37% of the vote and losing to the Workers' Party's Lee Li Lian, who won 54.5% of the vote. 

In the 2015 general election, Koh contested in Ang Mo Kio GRC as part of a six-member PAP team and won with 78.64% of the vote. Koh was elected as the Member of Parliament representing the Yio Chu Kang ward of Ang Mo Kio GRC. In the 2020 general election, he joined the PAP team contesting in Tampines GRC and won with 66.41% of the vote. 

Koh had served as Minister of State for Trade and Industry and Minister of State for National Development concurrently between 2016 and 2017 and later Senior Minister of State for Trade and Industry between 2017 and 2020 and Senior Minister of State for National Development between 2017 and 2018.

He also served as Deputy Secretary-General of the National Trades Union Congress (NTUC) between 2018 and 2021.

Education
Koh attended MacRitchie Primary School, Maris Stella High School and Hwa Chong Junior College before graduating from the Yong Loo Lin School of Medicine at the National University of Singapore in 1996 with a Bachelor of Medicine, Bachelor of Surgery degree. 

He subsequently went on to complete a Master of Medicine degree in surgery at the National University of Singapore and obtained fellowships from the Royal College of Surgeons of Edinburgh and Academy of Medicine, Singapore. 

He also received two Health Manpower Development Programme Scholarships from the Ministry of Health (MOH) to undergo advanced training in the surgical treatment of inflammatory bowel diseases in Edinburgh and at the Cleveland Clinic in Ohio.

Career

Medical career 
Koh is the founding director of the Colorectal Cancer Genomic Health Service at Singapore General Hospital. He was also a consultant colorectal surgeon in private practice at Mount Elizabeth Medical Centre and a visiting consultant surgeon at Singapore General Hospital and Changi General Hospital. 

Koh had also been a clinical lecturer at the National University of Singapore, adjunct assistant professor at the Duke-NUS Graduate Medical School, and adjunct clinician scientist at the Agency for Science, Technology and Research's Institute of Bioengineering and Nanotechnology.

Political career 
Koh entered politics in January 2013 when he contested as the People's Action Party (PAP) candidate in a by-election in Punggol East SMC triggered by the resignation of its Member of Parliament, Michael Palmer, after it was revealed that he had an extra-marital affair. He contested against candidates from three other parties: Workers' Party's Lee Li Lian; Reform Party's Kenneth Jeyaretnam; and Singapore Democratic Alliance's Desmond Lim. The by-election ended with Koh garnering 43.37% of the vote and losing to Lee, who won with 54.5% of the vote.

During the campaigning, Koh had called himself "kaki lang" ("one of us" in Teochew) and "son of Punggol". When reporters asked him about his family's ownership of two cars, he had said, "everybody has a car, we have two... We are professionals, we need to travel." His words were perceived as a blunder and reeking of elitism. After losing the election, he admitted that he had misspoken, saying, "It's not logical, even an idiot wouldn't say that. So it was partly my fault."

In the 2015 general election, Koh joined the six-member PAP team contesting in Ang Mo Kio GRC Following the results of the election, Koh was elected into Parliament when the six-member PAP team won and clinched 78.64% or 135,115 of the electorate's valid votes in the constituency. and they won with 78.64% of the vote against the Reform Party. Koh thus became a Member of Parliament representing the Yio Chu Kang ward of Ang Mo Kio GRC.

On 1 January 2016, Koh was appointed Minister of State at the Ministries of National Development and Trade and Industry. On 1 May 2017, he was promoted to Senior Minister of State and continued serving in the two Ministries; he relinquished his position in the Ministry of National Development on 30 April 2018. On 23 April 2018, Koh was appointed Deputy Secretary-General of the National Trades Union Congress and he held this position until 15 May 2021.

In the 2020 general election, Koh switched to join the five-member PAP team contesting in Tampines GRC and they won with 66.41% of the vote against the National Solidarity Party. Koh thus became the Member of Parliament representing the Tampines Central ward of Tampines GRC. On 27 July 2020, he was appointed Senior Minister of State at the Ministry of Health. He took up an additional appointment as Senior Minister of State at the Ministry of Manpower on 15 May 2021. Koh was appointed Senior Minister of State at the Ministry of Sustainability and the Environment on 13 June 2022, while relinquishing his Ministry of Health portfolio.

Personal life 
A Chinese Singaporean of Teochew descent, Koh grew up in a farmhouse at Lorong Cheng Lim in Punggol before he and his family moved to a four-room HDB flat in Toa Payoh. His father was a bus driver who drove the public bus service 82. Koh was the oldest child in his family and often worked part-time jobs when he was young to support his family.

Koh is married to a doctor, with whom he has two daughters.

References

External links 
 Koh Poh Koon on Parliament of Singapore
 Doctor's Profile – Dr Koh Poh Koon
 PAP announces candidate for Punggol East SMC

Singaporean people of Teochew descent
People's Action Party politicians
Singaporean colorectal surgeons
National University of Singapore alumni
Hwa Chong Junior College alumni
People from Singapore
1972 births
Living people
Members of the Parliament of Singapore